The José Vasconcelos World Award of Education is granted by the World Cultural Council as a recognition to renowned educators, to experts in the field of teaching, and to legislators of education policies who have significant influence in enriching the culture of mankind. This award has been presented biennially since 1988.

The qualifying jury is formed by several members of the Interdisciplinary Committee of the World Cultural Council and a group of distinguished educators.

The World Award of Education grants a Diploma, a Commemorative medal, and US$10,000.

The award is named after José Vasconcelos.

Award recipients

See also 

 World Cultural Council
 Albert Einstein World Award of Science
 Leonardo da Vinci World Award of Arts
 José Vasconcelos
 Prizes named after people
 List of education awards

References

External links 
[https://web.archive.org/web/20130318063536/http://www.consejoculturalmundial.org/awards.php Official site]

Education awards